Mohammad Imran Sadiq (born 3 September 1990) is a Pakistani cricketer. He made his Twenty20 debut for Multan in the 2018–19 National T20 Cup on 11 December 2018.

References

External links
 

1990 births
Living people
Pakistani cricketers
Multan cricketers
Place of birth missing (living people)